William, Bill, or Billy Yates may refer to:

William Yates (died 1558 or 1559) (1505–1558/1559), Member of Parliament for Lincoln
William Yates (college president) (1720–1764), College of William & Mary's fifth president (1761–1764)
William Yates (missionary) (1792–1845), Baptist missionary to India
William Yates (athlete) (1880–1967), British Olympic racewalker
William Yates (footballer) (1883–?), English footballer
William Yates (politician) (1921–2010), British and Australian politician
William H. Yates (died 1868), American abolitionist and writer
Bill Yates (footballer) (1903–1978), English footballer and cricketer
Bill Yates (1921–2001), American cartoonist
Billy Yates (American football) (born 1980), professional offensive lineman
Billy Yates (singer) (born 1963), American country singer
Billy Yates (album), his self-titled debut album

See also
William Butler Yeats (pronounced Yates, 1865–1939), poet & dramatist
Billy Yeats (pronounced Yates, 1951–2013), English footballer
William Yates Atkinson (1854–1899), governor of Georgia, US
William Yates Peel (1789–1858), British Tory politician
William Yates Redpath (1922–1989), Scottish footballer